Journal of Physics: Condensed Matter is a weekly peer-reviewed scientific journal established in 1989 and published by IOP Publishing. The journal covers all areas of condensed matter physics including soft matter and nanostructures. The editor-in-chief is Gianfranco Pacchioni (University of Milano-Bicocca).

The journal was formed by the merger of Journal of Physics C:  Solid State Physics and Journal of Physics F: Metal Physics in 1989.

Abstracting and indexing 
This journal is abstracted and indexed in:

According to the Journal Citation Reports, the journal has a 2021 impact factor of 2.745.

References

External links 
 

Physics journals
IOP Publishing academic journals
Weekly journals
English-language journals
Publications established in 1989